Simonne Jacquemard (1924 – 16 December 2009) was a French writer and winner of the 1962 Prix Renaudot. She married Jacques Brosse.

Works
La famille Borgia: Roman, R. Laffont, 1957; La Thune du Guay, 1960
 Le Veilleur de nuit, Éditions du Seuil, 1962, Prix Renaudot
 Trois Mystiques grecs, Albin Michel, 1997, 
Les Chevaux du vent, Roc de Bourzac, Editions du Roc De Bourzac, 2003, 
Pythagore et l'harmonie des sphères, Seuil, 2004, 
L'Ange musicien, Fédérop, 2006,

References

1924 births
2009 deaths
Prix Renaudot winners
20th-century French women writers
21st-century French women writers
20th-century French non-fiction writers
21st-century French non-fiction writers